Aleksandr Tumasyan may refer to:

Association football 
 Aleksandr Aleksandrovich Tumasyan, Armenian player born in 1992
 Aleksandr Sergeyevich Tumasyan, Russian coach born in 1955